The Camrail locomotive fleet is a fleet of diesel locomotives operated by Camrail which is the operator for the Cameroon Railway system, which is 1000mm gauge. Not all locomotives in a class remain in service; some locomotives have been on loan.

Camrail Locomotive fleet 

 Fleet 1 
 Fleet 2 
 Fleet 3 
 Gallery

See also 

 Camrail
 Rail transport in Cameroon#Rolling stock

References 

Rail transport in Cameroon